The 2019–20 Atlanta SC season was the club's first season playing professionally and its first in the National Independent Soccer Association (NISA), a newly established third division soccer league in the United States.

Overview 
On November 20, 2018, the National Independent Soccer Association announced that a team from Atlanta would begin play in its inaugural season in fall 2019.. In late 2019, following the end of the National Premier Soccer League season Atlanta SC announced it would be joining NISA.

On January 8, the full list of teams taking part in the 2020 U.S. Open Cup was announced including eight from the National Independent Soccer Association. Since Atlanta SC was not listed among these teams, and all professional clubs within the United States are required to take part in the tournament, this signaled that the club will not take part in professional play in the Spring 2020 season.

Roster

Players

Staff 

  Roberto Neves – Head coach
  João Garcia – Assistant coach
  Christiane Lessa – Assistant coach
  Abdul Bangura – Assistant coach

Competitions

NISA Fall season (Showcase)

Standings

Results summary

Matches

Squad statistics

Appearances and goals 

|-
! colspan="16" style="background:#dcdcdc; text-align:center"| Goalkeepers

|-
! colspan="16" style="background:#dcdcdc; text-align:center"| Defenders

|-
! colspan="16" style="background:#dcdcdc; text-align:center"| Midfielders

|-
! colspan="16" style="background:#dcdcdc; text-align:center"| Forwards

|-
|}

Goal scorers

Disciplinary record

References

External links 

 

American soccer clubs 2019 season
2019 in sports in Georgia (U.S. state)